Besat Institute of Higher Education of Kerman is one of centers of higher education in Kerman, this university operates under the supervision of Ministry of Science, Research and Technology of Iran.

Honors 
 First place in robotics Khwarizmi Festival (2010)

See also 
 Ministry of Science, Research and Technology of Iran
 Shahid Bahonar University of Kerman

References

External links 
 Official website of Besat University of Kerman
 Official website of Ministry of Science, Research and Technology of Iran

Universities in Iran
Education in Kerman Province
Buildings and structures in Kerman Province